Alexander William Snowden (1913-1981) was an English cricketer active from 1931 to 1939 who played for Northamptonshire (Northants). He was born in Peterborough on 15 August 1913 and died there on 7 May 1981. He appeared in 136 first-class matches as a righthanded batsman who bowled left arm medium pace. He scored 4,346 runs with a highest score of 128, one of two centuries, and took two wickets with a best performance of one for 5.

Notes

1913 births
1981 deaths
English cricketers
Northamptonshire cricketers